Jesper Florén (born 11 September 1990) is a Swedish professional footballer who plays for Västerås SK, as a right back.

Club career
Born in Örebro, Florén played youth football for local club Rynninge, as well as Dutch club Ajax. He has played senior football in Sweden with Elfsborg, GAIS and Gefle.

International career
Florén represented Sweden at under-17 and under-19 youth level.

References

External links

1990 births
Living people
Swedish footballers
Rynninge IK players
AFC Ajax players
IF Elfsborg players
GAIS players
Gefle IF players
Västerås SK Fotboll players
Allsvenskan players
Superettan players
Association football midfielders
Swedish expatriate footballers
Expatriate footballers in the Netherlands
Swedish expatriate sportspeople in the Netherlands
Sweden youth international footballers
Sportspeople from Örebro